SBPL may refer to:

Petrolina Airport, Brazil, ICAO airport code
Sembawang Public Library, a public library in Sembawang, Singapore